Bird Eater is an American metalcore band from Utah formed in 2005. The group consists of vocalist Jon Parkin, guitarists Chris Clement and Anthony Lucero, bassist Oz Inglorious, and drummer Kel Prime. Since its inception Bird Eater has been considered by fans, peers and critics as western death metal for their extensive use of dark country vibes and western themed artwork.

In 2007 the band recorded their debut EP Utah, which was released on Exigent Records, which was their only release to feature Jon Parkin on bass and vocals. In 2009, the band recruited Oz Inglorious to take over bass duties.

The band recorded the album Dead Mothers Make the Sun Set (DMMTSS) with engineer Andy Patterson working, released on Black Market Activities February 2014 after nearly 3 years of delays between the recording and the release. DMMTSS was released as a limited edition vinyl pressing as well as digital.

Members
 Jon Parkin (Vocals)
 Chris Clement (Guitars, vocals)
 Anthony Lucero (Guitars, vocals, artwork)
 Oz Inglorious (Bass)
 Kel Prime (Drums)

Discography
 Utah EP (2007)
 Dead Mothers Make the Sun Set full-length (2014)

References
Deaf Sparrow
SLC CWMA 2010 page-Bird Eater
Salt Lake City Weekly Interview
tastelikedirtreviews

External links
Facebook Communique
Myspace
Bandcamp
Official Store

2005 establishments in Utah
American death metal musical groups
American doom metal musical groups
Heavy metal musical groups from Utah
Musical groups established in 2005